The AEG C.III was a two-seat biplane reconnaissance aircraft, a single prototype of which was built during World War I. The aircraft featured an unusual fuselage design that completely filled the gap between the upper and lower sets of wings, to provide the pilot with improved vision, and to allow the observer a wider field of fire for his 7.92 mm (.312 in) machine gun. The pilot sat to the rear of the observer, who was stationed over the upper wing. This design was not as successful as had been hoped, and the C.III was never entered into service. Despite being heavier than the C.II, its maximum speed increased to 158 km/h (98 mph).

Specifications (AEG C.III)

See also

References

Further reading

 Kroschel, Günter; Stützer, Helmut: Die deutschen Militärflugzeuge 1910-18, Wilhelmshaven 1977
 Munson, Kenneth: Bomber 1914–19, Zürich 1968, Nr. 20
 Nowarra, Heinz: Die Entwicklung der Flugzeuge 1914-18, München 1959
 Sharpe, Michael: Doppeldecker, Dreifachdecker & Wasserflugzeuge, Gondrom, Bindlach 2001, 

C.III
Biplanes
1910s German military reconnaissance aircraft
Single-engined tractor aircraft
Aircraft first flown in 1915